The 1993–94 NBA season was the Timberwolves' 5th season in the National Basketball Association. The city of Minneapolis hosted the 1994 NBA All-Star Game. In the 1993 NBA draft, the Timberwolves selected Isaiah Rider out of UNLV with the fifth overall pick, and acquired Mike Brown from the Utah Jazz in the off-season. The Timberwolves continued to struggle losing their first five games of the season, then posted two 7-game losing streaks in December and February, holding a 14–32 record at the All-Star break. At midseason, the team traded Luc Longley to the Chicago Bulls in exchange for Stacey King. The Timberwolves posted an 8-game losing streak in March, and lost their final ten games of the season, finishing fifth in the Midwest Division with a 20–62 record.

Second-year star Christian Laettner led the team with 16.8 points, 8.6 rebounds and 1.2 blocks per game, while Rider finished second on the team in scoring with 16.6 points per game, was named to the NBA All-Rookie First Team, and also won the Slam Dunk Contest during the All-Star Weekend. In addition, Doug West provided the team with 14.7 points per game, while Michael Williams contributed 13.7 points, 7.2 assists and 1.7 steals per game, and Chuck Person provided with 11.6 points per game.

Following the season, the Timberwolves were nearly sold to a group of investors that would have moved the team to New Orleans, Louisiana, despite the stellar attendance at the Target Center. However, the NBA Board of Governors vetoed the sale, and new owner Glen Taylor promised to keep the team in Minneapolis. Also following the season, Person signed as a free agent with the San Antonio Spurs, while Thurl Bailey retired, and head coach Sidney Lowe was fired.

Draft picks

Roster

Regular season

Season standings

Record vs. opponents

Game log

Player statistics

Awards and records
 Isaiah Rider, NBA All-Rookie Team 1st Team

Transactions

Additions

References

Minnesota Timberwolves seasons
Timber
Timber
Monnesota